

The UFO HeliThruster is a two-seat autogyro designed and built by Ultimate Flying Options of New Zealand.

Design and development
The HeliThruster was first flown in 1993 and the first exported in 1997. It is a conventional autogyro with side-by-side seating for two in a pod-like enclosed cabin. It is powered by a 122 kW (165 hp) Subaru EJ-25 engine driving a pusher propeller.

Specifications

References

Notes

Bibliography

External links

Aircraft manufactured in New Zealand
Single-engined pusher autogyros
Aircraft first flown in 2003